A list of films produced in South Korea in 1985:

External links
1985 in South Korea

 1980-1989 at www.koreanfilm.org

1985
South Korean
1985 in South Korea